"Everything My Heart Desires" is the second single by English singer Adam Rickitt. The single debuted at number fifteen on the UK Singles Chart and stayed on the charts for six weeks. The song was covered by the singer Mandy Moore for her album I Wanna Be with You (2000).

Track listing
CD 1
 "Everything My Heart Desires" - 3:39
 "You Got Me Good" - 3:36
 "Album Megamix" - 6:31
 "Everything My Heart Desires" (video) - 3:39

CD 2
 "Everything My Heart Desires" - 3:38
 "Everything My Heart Desires" (Jewels & Stone My Heart Goes Bang Mix) - 6:14
 "Everything My Heart Desires" (Sharp Razor Club Mix) - 7:14

Cassette
 "Everything My Heart Desires" - 3:39
 "Everything My Heart Desires" (Beatmasters 12" Mix) - 4:50

12" vinyl promo
 "Everything My Heart Desires"
 "Everything My Heart Desires" (Jewel's & Stone's My Heart Goes Bang Mix)
 "Everything My Heart Desires" (Beatmasters 12" Mix)
 "Everything My Heart Desires" (Sharp Razor Club Mix)

Charts

References

External links
Music video on YouTube

1999 singles
1999 songs
Polydor Records singles